Allium eduardii is a plant species native to Russia, Mongolia, and northern China (Hebei,  Nei Mongol (Inner Mongolia), Ningxia and Xinjiang).

Allium eduardii has narrowly egg-shaped bulbs up to 10 mm across. Scapes are round in cross-section, up to 30 cm tall. Leaves are narrow and tubular, shorter than the scape. Umbel is hemispheric with purple flowers.

References

eduardii
Onions
Flora of temperate Asia
Plants described in 1875